Zyras artemis  is a species of beetle in the family Staphylinidae described by Wei-Ren Liang, Munetoshi Maruyama, and Hou-Feng Li in 2017.

References

Beetles described in 2017
Insects of Taiwan
Staphylinidae